"Not a Day Goes By" is a song by Australian singer-songwriter Rick Price.  It was released as the first single from his debut studio album  Heaven Knows. The song peaked at No. 5 in Australia and No. 73 in Germany.

At the ARIA Music Awards of 1993, "Not a Day Goes By" was nominated for Best New Talent and Breakthrough Artist.

Track listing
CD single (657798.2)
 "Not a Day Goes By" – 4:18
 "Fragile" – 3:26

CD maxi (657798 2)
 "Not a Day Goes By" – 4:18
 "Listen to Your Heart" – 3:48
 "Fragile" – 3:26

Charts and accreditation

Weekly charts

Year-end charts

Certifications

External links

References

Rick Price songs
Songs written by Rick Price
1992 songs
1992 singles
Columbia Records singles
Epic Records singles
Songs written by Pam Reswick
Songs written by Steve Werfel